Marcus Anthony Norris (born August 20, 1974) is an American former basketball player, who played for 17 years in Europe, in the guard position. He was the 2003-04 Israeli Basketball Premier League Defensive Player of the Year.

Early life and education
Norris was born in Jackson, Michigan, in 1974, playing basketball at Jackson High School. He attended Lansing Community College and Ball State University.

Career
Norris played basketball in Tampere, Finland, for Pyrbasket from 1996 to 1998. From 1998 to 2000, he played in Croatia for Svjetlost Brod. From 2000 to 2003, Norris went to Portugal to play for Portugal Telecom.

From 2003 to 2004, he played in Israel for Beni Hasharon, a team in the suburb of Tel Aviv. He was the  2003-04 Israeli Basketball Premier League Defensive Player of the Year.

From 2004 to 2005, Norris played in Kyiv, Ukraine, for BK KIE, a team owned by Sasha Volko. From 2005 to 2010, Norris went to CB Gran Canaria, Las Palmas Spain in the ACB. In 2010-2011, Norris went to Turkey for four months to play for Erdimir in the TBL Turkish League. 

In the 2011-2012, season Norris went to Lleida, Spain, and in February signed in Portugal with Benfica, before retiring in 2012.

References

1974 births
Living people
American expatriate basketball people in Croatia
American expatriate basketball people in Finland
American expatriate basketball people in Israel
American expatriate basketball people in Spain
American expatriate basketball people in Ukraine
American expatriate basketball people in Portugal
American men's basketball players
Basketball players from Michigan
Ball State Cardinals men's basketball players
CB Gran Canaria players
People from Jackson, Michigan
S.L. Benfica basketball players
Tampereen Pyrintö players